The 2024 Libertarian Party presidential primaries and caucuses will be a series of electoral contests to indicate non-binding preferences for the Libertarian Party's presidential candidate in the 2024 presidential election. These differ from the Republican or Democratic presidential primaries and caucuses in that they do not appoint delegates to represent a candidate at the party's convention to select the party's presidential nominee. The party's nominee will be chosen directly by registered delegates at the 2024 Libertarian National Convention, which is scheduled to take place from May 24-26,   2024 in Washington, D.C.

Candidates

Declared candidates 
The candidates in this section have declared their candidacies.

Formed exploratory committee 
 the following individual has, within the previous six months, announced the formation of an exploratory committee to look into running for president.
 Chase Oliver, former chair of the Atlanta Libertarian Party and nominee for U.S. Senate in Georgia in 2022.

See also
 2024 Democratic Party presidential primaries

 2024 Republican Party presidential primaries
 2024 United States presidential election

References

External links

Presidential primaries, 2024
2024 United States presidential primaries